Kaladian Coulibaly was a West African ruler who founded one of the first large Bambara kingdoms, centered on Ségou in what is now Mali.  Around 1650, Coulibaly's kingdom was one of the dominant forces in the region.  Though it lacked a systematic framework and thus failed to outlast his death (c. 1680), his great-grandson Bitòn Coulibaly would found a more stable Bambara Empire fifty years later on the same spot.

References
Davidson, Basil. Africa in History. New York: Simon & Schuster, 1995.

External links
Timeline of Western Sudan

Coulibaly, Kaladian
17th-century African people